"Single White Female" is a song written by Carolyn Dawn Johnson and Shaye Smith, and recorded by American country music artist Chely Wright.  It was released in March 1999 as the first single and title track from the album Single White Female.  The song became Wright's first and only number-one hit on the U.S. Billboard Hot Country Songs charts. Additionally, fellow country artist Trisha Yearwood sings harmony vocals on the song.

Music video
The music video was directed by Deaton Flanigen and premiered in March 1999. It takes place entirely on a city bus, with Chely performing by herself in the back of the bus, and in another scene with two backup singers and two guitarists while standing on the bus. In the beginning, it shows many of the bus's patrons, before moving to a "single white female looking for a special lover". A man gets on and eventually leaves the bus (having been seated in the row next to her and behind her, respectively) before he comes on a third time and sits next to her, where they glance at each other. The man eventually gets up, accidentally leaving his book on his seat. The woman grabs it and returns it to him, then they both walk off smiling at each other.

Chart positions
"Single White Female" debuted at number 66 on the U.S. Billboard Hot Country Singles & Tracks for the week of March 13, 1999, and peaked at number 36 on the Billboard Hot 100 chart, making it her highest peak on that chart as of April 2019.

Year-end charts

References

1999 singles
1999 songs
Chely Wright songs
Songs written by Carolyn Dawn Johnson
Song recordings produced by Tony Brown (record producer)
Song recordings produced by Buddy Cannon
Song recordings produced by Norro Wilson
Music videos directed by Deaton-Flanigen Productions
MCA Records singles
Songs written by Shaye Smith